Helmut Vollprecht (born 24 November 1941) is a German luger. He competed in the men's doubles event at the 1964 Winter Olympics.

References

External links
 

1941 births
Living people
German male lugers
Olympic lugers of the United Team of Germany
Lugers at the 1964 Winter Olympics
People from Görlitz (district)
Sportspeople from Saxony
20th-century German people